Víctor Raúl Perales Aguilar (born November 7, 1990, in Fresnillo, Zacatecas, Mexico) is a former Mexican footballer. He last played as a centre back for Venados of the Ascenso MX.

Club career
Perales played one season for K.R.C. Mechelen a Belgian Third Division team. Then he was sent on trial to the Chicago Fire a MLS team.

Club Deportivo Guadalajara
Víctor was one of the young promises of Club Deportivo Guadalajara and made 26 appearances without scoring.

Veracruz
On 29 May 2014 Guadalajara announced that Perales was traded to Veracruz along with money in exchange for Ángel Reyna.

References

External links
 

People from Fresnillo
Footballers from Zacatecas
C.D. Guadalajara footballers
1990 births
Living people
Association football defenders
Mexican footballers